Nebovidy is a municipality and village in Kolín District in the Central Bohemian Region of the Czech Republic. It has about 700 inhabitants.

Administrative parts
The village of Hluboký Důl is an administrative part of Nebovidy.

References

Villages in Kolín District